The 2017 National Women's League was the fifteenth season of the NWL since its establishment in 2002. Seven teams were again involved in this season representing the different regions in New Zealand. The final was played between Canterbury United Pride and Auckland, it finished 1–1 at full time before Auckland won it in extra time 3–2. It was Aucklands sixth title and first since 2009. Eleanor Isaac from Southern United was voted the 2017 National Women's League MVP for the season.

2017 National Women's League

Teams

Table

Matches
New Zealand women's football league matches took take place over October and November 2017

Round 1

Bye: Capital Football

Round 2

Bye: Canterbury United Pride

Round 3

Bye: Auckland

Round 4

Bye: Northern

Round 5

Bye: Central

Round 6

Bye: Southern United

Round 7

Bye: WaiBOP

Finals series
For the final series, the team that finishes second played off at home against the team that finishes third, while the team that finishes first has the week off before playing the winner of 2nd v 3rd. Southern qualified for the final series over Northern even though they ended up on equal points and Northern had the better goal difference due to head-to-head record, with Southern beating Northern 2–1 in the regular season. This meant they would face Auckland in Auckland, while Canterbury United Pride had the week off.

Preliminary Final

Final

Statistics

Top scorers

Own goals

References

External links
Official website

2017
football
Women
Women